pdfimages is an open-source command-line utility for lossless extraction of images from PDF files, including JPEG2000 and JBIG2 format when used with option -all. It is freely available as part of poppler-utils and xpdf-utils, and included in many Linux distributions.  

pdfimages originates from the xpdf package (but now part of poppler-utils). The Poppler software package, which is derived from xpdf, also includes an implementation of pdfimages.

See also
 List of PDF software

References

External links
 Poppler utils 0.68.0 for Windows

Graphics-related software for Linux
Free PDF software